Shrule-Glencorrib GAA is a Gaelic football club based in the village of Shrule on the County Mayo side of the border with County Galway. The club is focused exclusively on the game of Gaelic football. It takes part in competitions organized by Mayo GAA county board.

Achievements
 Mayo Senior Football Championship: Runner-Up 2005

Notable players
 Conor Mortimer

References

Gaelic games clubs in County Mayo
Gaelic football clubs in County Mayo